Ahmed bin Muhammad bin Muhammad Alathri Al-Maqdsi Arabic: (أحمد بن محمد بن محمد الأثري المقدسي) (30 December 1427 – 5 December 1499; 12 spring I 831 – 3 Mass I 905) was a 15th-century Shafi'i judge and a Shami Arab poet born and raised in Jerusalem. He received mental science and mobility in it, and then I spent it. He went to Damascus where he studied and preached at the Umayyad University. When he died he was buried in Little Door Cemetery. It has a poetry cabinet containing several prophetic poems. He is well known for his systems, the beauty of calligraphy, preaching, and rhetoric.

Biography 
Shihab al-Din Ahmad ibn Muhammad ibn Muhammad ibn Muhammad ibn Abi Bakr ibn Ubayyah al-Maqdisi was an former archaeologist. He was born on 12 Rabi' al-Awwal 831/30 December 1427 in Jerusalem in the Mamluk state and was brought up there.  He comes from an Aleppo family.  He received the mental and transmission sciences in it, and then the guardian of its judiciary.  And he remained in his position until the dismissal and exile of Sultan Al-Ashraf Qaytbay to Damascus as a punishment for him for the legal ruling he issued in 1473 to demolish the Jewish Synagogue, so he emigrated to Damascus.  And there he taught and preached in the Umayyad Mosque.  He died there on Jumada Al-Awwal 3, 905/December 5, 1499. He was buried in the Bab Al-Saghir cemetery, north of the tomb of Sheikh Hammad.

Publications 
The manuscript "The Precious Al-Nafis in investigating the issues of churches and revealing the intrigues of the polytheists in that" ( Original title: Nafis alnafayis fi tahariy masayil alkanayis wakashf ma lilmushrikin fi dhalik min aldasayis ), and "Fulfilling the covenants in the necessity of destroying the Church of the Jews" ( Original title: Wafa' aleahud fi wujub hadm kanisat alyahud ) are attributed to him.

His Poetry 
Omar Farroukh described him as "Ahmed bin Ubayyah was a scholar, preacher, and emotional poet, who had lyricism, description, and innovations." Among his innovations are:

ما مَخلَصي في الحب من شركِ الهوى         إلا بمدح المصطفى المأمونِ

زينُ الأَعاربِ في القراعِ وفي القِرى           ليثُ الكَتائب لم يخف لمنون

بدرٌ تبدَّى في حنينٍ للوغا                        فسبى عِداهُ بصارمٍ وحنين

في البأسِ ما في الناسِ مثلُ محمدٍ               كلا، ولا في الحسنِ والتمكين

هو فاتحٌ كالحمدِ أول سورةٍ                      وجميعُ أهلِ القربِ كالتأمين.

References 

1427 births
1499 deaths
15th-century Arabic poets
Sharia judges